is a Japanese tarento and model.

Nishina was represented with Irving until she left on 31 December 2014. Her father was actor Hiroki Matsukata and her mother is actress Akiko Nishina, in which they are graduates for the entertainment industry. Nishina's parents were divorced in December 1998. After the divorce she grew up with her mother.

Filmography

TV programmes

Internet

TV dramas

Films

Stage

Advertisements

References

External links
 – Ameba Blog (29 January 2009 – ) 

Japanese television personalities
People from Kyoto
1984 births
Living people